Democratic Republic of the Congo–United Kingdom relations are the bilateral relations between the Democratic Republic of the Congo and the United Kingdom. The Democratic Republic of the Congo maintains an embassy in London and the United Kingdom maintains an embassy in Kinshasa.

The United Kingdom established its first Diplomatic mission with the Congo Free State in 1902 when a British Consulate was built in the then capital Boma. A vice-consulate later opened in Léopoldville in 1906. In 1923 Léopoldville was proclaimed the capital of the Belgian Congo and in 1930 the British Consulate in Boma closed and the vice-consulate in Léopoldville became the consulate.

Along with the United States the United Kingdom was a supporter of the Mobutu Sese Seko regime in Zaire due to the regime's anti-communist stance. President Mobutu made a state visit to the United Kingdom in December 1973.

The Democratic Republic of the Congo is a recipient of UK Aid, in 2014 the Department for International Development spent £162.2 million on programmes in the Democratic Republic of the Congo.

References

 
United Kingdom
Congo, Democratic Republic